Miroslav Horníček (10 November 1918 in Plzeň – 15 February 2003 in Liberec) was a Czech actor, writer, director, artist and theatre theoretician. He is well known in the Czech Republic for his on-stage partnership with Jan Werich, his talkshows (Hovory H ...) and many small roles in Czech movies and TV.

Partial filmography
 Polibek ze stadionu (1948)
 Pan Novák (1949) - Jirotka
 Soudný den (1949)
 Mikolás Ales (1952) - Valek
 Mladá léta (1953) - Vaclav Svetly
 There Was Once a King... (1955) - Beautiful prince - son of Alabaster I.
 Z mého zivota (1955) - (voice, uncredited)
 When the Woman Butts In (1960) - Dr. Faust
 Kazdá koruna dobrá (1961) - Krytina
 Neschovávejte se, kdyz prsí (1962) - farár Tadeás Hora
 Bez svatozáre (1964) - Narrator (voice)
 Táto, sezen stene (1964) - Father
 Lov na mamuta (1965) - (voice)
 Ohne Pass in fremden Betten (1965) - Mr. Jelínek
 Smrt za oponou (1967) - kapitán Chrástek
 Kinoautomat (1967) - Pan Novak
 Hudba kolonád (1975)
 Barrandovské nocturno aneb Jak film zpíval a tancil (1984) - Himself - entertainer

References

External links

Miroslav Horníček on Česko-Slovenská filmová databáze (Czechoslovak film database)

1918 births
2003 deaths
Actors from Plzeň
Czech male dramatists and playwrights
Recipients of Medal of Merit (Czech Republic)
Czech male stage actors
Czech male film actors
Czech male television actors
20th-century Czech dramatists and playwrights
20th-century male writers
Film people from Plzeň
Czechoslovak writers
Recipients of the Thalia Award